Kundrathur Nageswarar Temple, also known as Vada Thirunageswaram, is a Hindu temple dedicated to Shiva, located in the neighbourhood of Kundrathur in Chennai, India. The temple was built in the 12th century by the Shivite saint Sekkilar and is modelled on the Thirunageswaram temple at Kumbakonam.

The temple is one of the nine Navagraha temples of the Tondai Mandalam and is known as the Rahu sthala (lit. place of Rahu).

History
Sekkilar, the 12th-century Shivaite poet-saint and the author of the Periya Puranam, built the temple at his native place of Kundrathur after visiting the Nageshwara Swami temple in Tirunageswaram near Kumbakonam, which is associated with Rahu, one of the navagrahas (nine planets) of Hinduism. Since the temple at Kundrathur is situated to the north of the original temple at Thirunageshwaram, the temple came to be known as Vada Nageshwaram (lit. "North Nageshwaram"). The temple features several Chola architectural elements.

The temple complex
The temple is located on the Kundrathur Main Road. The main deity of the temple is Lord Nageswarar (Shiva) and his consort goddess Kamakshi Amman (Parvathi). The main entrance with a five-tier tower (raja gopuram) lies on the eastern side of the complex. The main entrance leads to a mandapa or auditorium of the Chola times, near which a shrine for Kamakshi Amman is present. The main deity is the shiva linga, worshipped as Nageshwara Swami, and the utsava-murti or the deity of procession is Somaskanda. There is also a separate shrine for Sekkilar, where the idol of the scholar-devotee sports a garland of prayer beads (japa mala) in his right hand and palm-leaf manuscripts in his left hand. Several inscriptions of the reigns of the Chola, Pandya, and Vijayanagara monarchs, and the kings such as Rajanarayana Sambuvarayar have been discovered in the temple.

The temple is one of the nine Shiva temples around Porur associated with the Navagraha.

A school of 70 pupils functions at the temple premises, which was started in September 1990.

See also
 Religion in Chennai
 Heritage structures in Chennai

References

Further reading
 

Hindu temples in Chennai
12th-century establishments in India
Navagraha temples in Chennai